The 107th Virginia General Assembly was the meeting of the legislative branch of the Virginia state government following the Virginia state elections of 1911. It convened on January 14, 1911 in Richmond for one session before adjourning on March 15, 1912.

Party summary
Resignations and new members are discussed in the "Changes in membership" section, below.

Senate

House of Delegates

Senate

Leadership

Members

Changes in membership

Senate
April 24, 1913, David C. Cummings, Jr. (D-1st district) dies. His seat remained unfilled until the next regular session.
October 25, 1913, J. Randolph Tucker (D-22nd district) resigns to accept appointment as a federal judge in the Territory of Alaska. His seat remained unfilled until the next regular session.

See also
 List of Virginia state legislatures

References

Government of Virginia
Virginia legislative sessions
1912 in Virginia
1913 in Virginia
1912 U.S. legislative sessions
1913 U.S. legislative sessions